Salvador Valeriano Pineda (born 6 August 1965) is a Honduran politician. He currently serves as deputy of the National Congress of Honduras representing the National Party of Honduras for Lempira.

References

1965 births
Living people
People from Lempira Department
Deputies of the National Congress of Honduras
National Party of Honduras politicians
Place of birth missing (living people)